"Out of Touch" is a song by Hall & Oates, from the album Big Bam Boom.

Out of Touch may also refer to:
 Out of touch (phrase) or "square"
 "Out of Touch" (Dove Cameron song)
 "Out of Touch", by The Grass Roots, from the album Let's Live for Today
 "Out of Touch", by Lucinda Williams, from the album Essence
 "Out of Touch", by Squeeze, from the album Sweets from a Stranger

See also
 Out of Touch in the Wild, an album by English indie rock band Dutch Uncles